The red-bellied paradise flycatcher (Terpsiphone rufiventer), also known as the black-headed paradise flycatcher, is a medium-sized passerine bird of the family of monarch flycatchers. It is native to intra-tropical forests of Africa. The colouring is somewhat variable across the bird's range. Both females and juveniles lack the tail streamers and are a duller brown colour. It is closely related to the African paradise flycatcher, and the two can hybridise.

Taxonomy and systematics
The name "red-bellied paradise flycatcher" is also used as an alternate name for  Bedford's paradise flycatcher.

Subspecies
Ten subspecies are recognized:
 T. r. rufiventer - (Swainson, 1837): Found in Senegal, Gambia and western Guinea
 T. r. nigriceps - (Hartlaub, 1855): Originally described as a separate species. Found from Sierra Leone and Guinea to Togo and south-western Benin
 Fagan's paradise-flycatcher (T. r. fagani) - (Bannerman, 1921): Originally described as a separate species. Found in Benin and south-western Nigeria
 Ashy-tailed paradise-flycatcher (T. r. tricolor) - (Fraser, 1843): Originally described as a separate species. Found on Bioko (Gulf of Guinea)
 Cameroon ashy-tailed paradise-flycatcher (T. r. neumanni) - Stresemann, 1924: Found from south-eastern Nigeria to northern Angola
 T. r. schubotzi - (Reichenow, 1911): Originally described as a separate species. Found in south-eastern Cameroon and south-western Central African Republic
 T. r. mayombe - (Chapin, 1932): Found in Congo and western Democratic Republic of Congo
 T. r. somereni - Chapin, 1948: Found in western and southern Uganda
 Uganda black-headed paradise-flycatcher (T. r. emini) - Reichenow, 1893: Originally described as a separate species. Found in south-eastern Uganda, western Kenya and north-western Tanzania
 Fiery paradise-flycatcher (T. r. ignea) - (Reichenow, 1901): Originally described as a separate species. Found in eastern Central African Republic, Democratic Republic of Congo, north-eastern Angola and north-western Zambia

Until 2009, the Annobón paradise flycatcher was classified as a subspecies (T. r. smithii) of the Red-bellied paradise flycatcher.

Description
The adult male of this species is about 17 cm long, but the long tail streamers nearly double the birds length. It has a black head, and the rest of the plumage is chestnut, other than a prominent black wingbar. The female is duller and lacks the tail streamers. Young birds are plain brown.

The males show considerable variation in plumage in some areas. There is a morph of this species in which the male has the chestnut parts of the plumage replaced by white, and some races have black tail streamers.

The red-bellied paradise flycatcher is a noisy bird with a sharp zweet call. It has short legs and sits very upright whilst perched prominently, like a shrike. It is insectivorous, often hunting by flycatching.

The black-bellied African paradise flycatcher, Terpsiphone viridis, is closely related to this species, and hybrids occur with the underparts a mixture of black and red.

Distribution and habitat
The red-bellied paradise flycatcher is a common resident breeder in tropical western Africa south of the Sahara Desert. This species is usually found in thick forests and other well-wooded habitats. Two eggs are laid in a tiny cup nest in a tree.

References

 Birds of The Gambia by Barlow, Wacher and Disley, 

red-bellied paradise flycatcher
Birds of the Gulf of Guinea
Birds of Sub-Saharan Africa
red-bellied paradise flycatcher